Tiroler Wasserkraft Arena is an indoor sporting arena located in Innsbruck, Austria.  The arena has a capacity of 3,000 people and was built in 2005 for the 2005 World Ice Hockey Championships. It is currently the home arena of HC Innsbruck who play in the Austrian Hockey League.

See also
OlympiaWorld Innsbruck

References

Indoor ice hockey venues in Austria
Venues of the 2012 Winter Youth Olympics
Sports venues in Tyrol (state)
Buildings and structures in Innsbruck
Sport in Innsbruck